Gary Amlong (born August 14, 1962, in St. Louis, Missouri) is a retired American soccer player who spent two seasons in the Major Indoor Soccer League and several in the American Indoor Soccer Association.

Amlong was a 1981 NJCAA First Team All American soccer player at STLCC-Florissant Valley.  In 1982, Amlong signed with the Kansas City Comets of the Major Indoor Soccer League.  He played two seasons with the Comets before moving to the Louisville Thunder of the American Indoor Soccer Association.  In 1988, he was a member of the Busch SC team which won the National Challenge Cup.

References

External links
 MISL stats

1962 births
Living people
American Indoor Soccer Association players
Soccer players from St. Louis
Kansas City Comets (original MISL) players
Louisville Thunder players
Major Indoor Soccer League (1978–1992) players
American soccer players
Association football midfielders